This is a list of the members of the Dewan Rakyat (House of Representatives) of the 14th Parliament of Malaysia.

Compositions

Outcomes of the 14th general election

Composition before dissolution

Last election pendulum 
(Results and status at 9 May 2018) The 14th General Election witnessed 124 governmental seats and 98 non-governmental seats filled the Dewan Rakyat. The government side has 49 safe seats and 11 fairly safe seats, while the other side has 21 safe seats and 4 fairly safe seats.

Changes in the composition of the Dewan Rakyat

Seating arrangement

Latest seating arrangement
This is the seating arrangement as of its last meeting on 10 October 2022. The seating does not reflect current political allegiances. In addition, there were three seats that is labelled as VACANT, namely Batu Sapi, Gerik and Pekan. Both of Batu Sapi and Gerik seats vacancy is due to the death of the incumbent Member of Parliament (MP) for both of this constituency, which happened on 2 October 2020 (Batu Sapi) and 16 November 2020 (Gerik) respectively. While, the Pekan seat vacancy is due to the imprisonment of the incumbent Member of Parliament (MP) for the constituency, which effect on 23 August 2022.

Supposedly, according to election tradition, a by-election may be held as the parliamentary term at that time is not exceeding up to maximum three years (where its first meeting is on July 2018, with the latest it can held on July 2021). However, due to the second series of Coronavirus pandemic that was seriously re-arose nationwide post-state election of Sabah and countless (tight) lockdowns at the same time since October 2020, the plan from Election Commission (SPR) to conduct the by-elections for Batu Sapi and Gerik constituency had been cancelled by taking account on this matter. In November 2020, the King or Yang Di-Pertuan Agong, Al-Sultan Abdullah had declared the Emergency Proclamation for both of the parliamentary constituencies, together with one state constituency in Sabah, namely Bugaya, located in Semporna parliamentary seats that was also vacant due to the death of its incumbent Sabah state Members of the Legislative Assembly (MLA). The proclamation was renounced by the King almost two years later.

 The seating arrangement is viewable at the official website of the Parliament.

Previous seating arrangement

Seating arrangement until its last second term meeting on 5 December 2019.

Elected members by state

Perlis

Kedah

Kelantan

Terengganu

Penang

Perak

Pahang

Selangor

Federal Territory of Kuala Lumpur

Federal Territory of Putrajaya

Negeri Sembilan

Malacca

Johor

Federal Territory of Labuan

Sabah

Sarawak 

On 12 June 2018, all Sarawak-based BN parties, i.e. Parti Pesaka Bumiputera Bersatu (PBB), Parti Rakyat Sarawak (PRS), Progressive Democratic Party (PDP) and Sarawak United People's Party (SUPP), officially left BN and formed a new coalition, Sarawak Parties Alliance, due to BN's defeat in the general elections on 9 May 2018.

Notes

References 

14th Parliament of Malaysia
Lists of members of the Dewan Rakyat